The Washington D.C. Area Film Critics Association Award for Best Cinematography is an annual award given by the Washington D.C. Area Film Critics Association.

Winners and nominees

2010s

2020s

Multiple wins
Emmanuel Lubezki - 4
Roger Deakins - 2
Claudio Miranda - 2

References

Cinematography, Best
Awards for best cinematography